Tabernaemontana hallei is a species of plant in the family Apocynaceae. It is found in Gabon and Cameroon.

References

hallei